Gordon Castle is located near Fochabers in Moray, Scotland. Historically known as the Bog-of-Gight or Bog o'Gight, it was the principal seat of the Dukes of Gordon. Following 18th-century redevelopment, it became one of the largest country houses ever built in Scotland, although much has since been demolished.

History

The original castle was built by George Gordon, 2nd Earl of Huntly in the 1470s and enlarged by his grandson and George Gordon, 1st Marquess of Huntly. An inventory of the contents from November 1648 mentions lavish beds and a "hen house", a parrot cage in the long gallery.

The first wave of substantial extension was undertaken by Alexander Gordon, 2nd Duke of Gordon in the 1720s, greatly increasing the floorplan in relation to the original tower house.

Architect John Adam was commissioned, alongside the exiled Huguenot (French) architect Abraham Roumieu, to redesign the castle in 1764, but this did not come to fruition. Eventually the commission fell to the lesser-known Edinburgh architect, John Baxter, who rebuilt it in 1769 for Alexander Gordon, 4th Duke of Gordon. The central four-storey block incorporated a six-storey medieval tower called the Bog-of-Gight, and was flanked by a pair of two-storey wings. In 1827 the Aberdeen architect Archibald Simpson was commissioned to redesign the east wing after it was destroyed by fire.

At its peak, the main façade was 568 feet (173 metres) long. Following the deaths of the 7th and 8th dukes within a decade of one another the Gordon Estates of 180,000 acres (73,000 hectares) were put up for sale by the 9th Duke to pay the enormous death duties. The majority of the contents of the castle were sold in 1938, although some family portraits and furniture were removed to Goodwood House. By 1952 large areas of the castle were infested with dry rot.

Most of the castle was demolished, but the 16th-century tower of Bog-of-Gight and one of the wings—now a detached medium-sized country house in its own right—survive.

References

External links

A description of Gordon Castle published in the 1880s
Engraving of Gordon Castle by James Fittler in the digitised copy of Scotia Depicta, or the antiquities, castles, public buildings, noblemen and gentlemen's seats, cities, towns and picturesque scenery of Scotland, 1804 at National Library of Scotland
Gordon Castle at House of Gordon, Virginia
Profile of the Parish of Bellie, with information about the castle and estate – probably dates from the late 18th century

Castles in Moray
Country houses in Moray

Category A listed buildings in Moray
Listed castles in Scotland
Inventory of Gardens and Designed Landscapes
House of Gordon